The Medical Dental Building is a historic office building located in Downtown Seattle, near McGraw Square and adjacent to the Nordstrom Building.

Description and history
The original half 18-story building was designed in the Late Gothic Revival style and features terra cotta cladding on top of a concrete frame. A later addition in 1950, in the Moderne style, extended the structure eastward and renovated most of the original building.

The construction of a medical and dental center in Seattle was proposed in 1921 by a group of businessmen in the respective industries. The $2 million building opened in May 1925 and was initially owned by the Bradner family, who subsequently owned The Bradner Building Company. It was designed by architect John Alfred Creutzer (1874–1929); architect Abraham H. Albertson (1872–1964) supervised its construction; A.W. Quist Company was the general contractor.

At the time it opened, it was the third-tallest building in the world to exclusively use reinforced concrete construction. The building continues to house medical and dental practices, as well as retail spaces. , it has 130 tenants occupying  of office space.

The building was renovated in 2005 by Goodman Real Estate after the firm bought the property for $38 million. It was subsequently added to the National Register of Historic Places and declared a Seattle landmark. The building was sold to Menashe Properties of Portland in 2019 for $113 million.

See also

 List of Seattle landmarks
 National Register of Historic Places listings in Seattle, Washington

References

External links
 

1920s architecture in the United States
1925 establishments in Washington (state)
Buildings and structures completed in 1925
Gothic Revival architecture in Washington (state)
Late Gothic Revival architecture
Moderne architecture in the United States
National Register of Historic Places in Seattle